Kochu TV is a Malayalam kids  pay television channel from Sun TV Network, Chennai. The channel is based in Cochin, Kerala. Kochu TV is the only children's channel in Malayalam (excluding Malayalam & English audio feeds in pan-India channels and the state-owned Kite Victers). The channel broadcasts a mix of programmes, all in Malayalam, including popular animated series and pre-school content (locally produced and international).

Following Surya TV and Kiran TV (now Surya Movies), the Sun TV Network launched its third 24X7 Malayalam channel "Kochu TV" on October 2011. The target audience of Kochu TV are children in the age of 4 to 14 years. 

Chutti TV (Tamil), Chintu TV (Kannada), and Kushi TV (Telugu) are the sister channels of Kochu TV.

Programming

Current programming

Former programming

References 

Malayalam-language television channels
Children's television channels in India
Television stations in Kochi
2011 establishments in Kerala
Television channels and stations established in 2011